The Counterfeit Constable (French: Allez France!) is a 1964 French comedy film directed by Robert Dhéry and Pierre Tchernia and starring Ronald Fraser, Diana Dors and Arthur Mullard.

Plot
A French rugby supporter (Robert Dhéry), in England for a match at Twickenham, is accidentally elbowed in the face and loses two teeth. He goes to the dentist who fits new teeth and tells him he musn't open his mouth for two hours, to allow the cement holding them to set properly. He starts to wait, and in the waiting room he sees the uniform of another patient, who's a policeman (Bernard Cribbins). He tries it on for fun, and while wearing it by sheer chance he saves Diana Dors, a movie star who lives next door. He is congratulated by police chiefs who take him for a true police officer. He can't tell them he isn't because he can't open his mouth and besides, he doesn't speak English. He becomes lost in London, and many misunderstandings and misadventures follow. And to make matters worse he needs to return home to France urgently as he is due to be married.

Main cast
 Robert Dhéry as Henri Martineau
 Colette Brosset as Lady Yvette Brisburn 'Vévette'
 Diana Dors as herself
 Ronald Fraser as Sergent Timothy Reagan
 Henri Génès as Gros Max
 Jean Lefebvre as Le supporter saoul avec le coq
 Jean Carmet as Le porte drapeau
 Bernard Cribbins as Bob, l'agent 202
 Jean Richard as Un français dans le bus
 Raymond Bussières as Un français dans le bus
 Pierre Tornade as  Un français dans le bus
 Richard Vernon as Lord Brisburn
 Catherine Sola as Nicole
 Percy Herbert as L'agent Baxter
 Amy Dalby as Mrs. Throttle
 Robert Rollis as Le supporter avec le bonnet tricolore
 Colin Blakely as L'aveugle
 Colin Gordon as Le dentiste W. Martin
 Georgina Cookson as L'assistante du dentiste
 Robert Burnier as Le supporter tarbais
 Robert Destain as Le supporter cinéaste
 Pierre Doris as Un français dans le bus
 Mark Lester as Gérald
 Arthur Mullard as Le malfaiteur
 Godfrey Quigley as Inspecteur Savory
 Margaret Whiting as La femme de l'agent 202
 Pierre Olaf as Le standardiste du commissariat

Production
Diana Dors was then living in Los Angeles but returned to Europe to make the film.

Location shooting took place around London. Interiors were shot at Shepperton Studios and the Billancourt Studios in Paris. The film's sets were designed by the art director Jean Mandaroux.

Review
Although it is a French film, The Counterfeit Constable nevertheless carries all the hallmarks and shows the type of humour found in an Ealing comedy.  This is probably because nearly half the cast were composed of British actors and the film was mostly set in London.

References

External links

1964 films
1960s French-language films
French comedy films
Films set in London
1960s police comedy films
1964 comedy films
Films shot in London
Films shot at Billancourt Studios
Films shot at Shepperton Studios
Films with screenplays by Pierre Tchernia
Films directed by Pierre Tchernia
1960s French films